Hanukkah music  (or Chanukah music) contains several songs associated with the festival of Hanukkah.

Hanukkah blessings

There are three Hanukkah blessings (Modern Hebrew: בְּרָכוֹת לֵחֲנֻכָּה Berakhot Laḥanukka, Lit: Hanukkah blessings) that are sung for lighting the candles of the menorah.  The third blessing (shehecheyanu) is only sung on the first night.  After the two or three blessings are sung, Hanerot Halalu is chanted. The following blessings are transliterated according to proper Modern Hebrew.

The popular tune for these blessings was composed by Samuel E. Goldfarb and his brother Israel Golfarb in the early 20th century.

Ma'oz Tzur

"Ma'oz Tzur", also a widely known English version as "Rock of Ages", is a Jewish liturgical poem or piyyut. It is written in Hebrew, and is usually sung on the holiday of Hanukkah, after lighting the festival lights. Its six stanzas correspond to five events of Jewish history and a hope for the future. Of its six stanzas, often only the first stanza is sung (or the first and fifth), as this is what directly pertains to Hanukkah.  "Ma'oz Tzur" was written sometime in the 13th century.

 Ma'oz Tzur for instruments and voice by Chibat haPiyut.

Psalm 30
"A psalm, a song for the Dedication, of a House.." 

 Psalm 30 in Vizhnitz melody, by Invitation to Piyut

Judas Maccabaeus

Judas Maccabaeus is an oratorio by George Frideric Handel. During Hanukkah, the melody for "See, the Conqu’ring Hero Comes" is used by Spanish and Portuguese Jewish communities for the hymn En Kelohenu.

Mrs. Maccabeus, to the tune of "Oh Hanukkah." By Ben Aronin of Congregation Anshe Emet in Chicago.

Oh Chanukah

"Oh Chanukah" (also "Chanukah, Oh Chanukah") is an English version of the Yiddish "Oy Chanukah" (Yiddish: חנוכּה אױ חנוכּה Khanike Oy Khanike).  The English words, while not a translation, are roughly based on the Yiddish. "Oy Chanukah" is a traditional Yiddish Chanukah song and the English version, along with "I Have a Little Dreidel," is one of the most recognized English Chanukah songs.  Both songs are playful with upbeat tempo and are sung by children. The lyrics are about dancing the horah, eating latkes, playing dreidel, lighting the candles and singing happy songs.

I Have a Little Dreidel

"I Have a Little Dreidel" (also known as the "Dreidel Song") is a very famous song in the English speaking world for Hanukkah, which also has a Yiddish version.  The Yiddish version is Ikh Bin A Kleyner Dreydl, (Yiddish: איך בין אַ קלײנער דרײדל  Lit: I am a little dreidel).  The English version of the song is well associated with the festival of Hanukkah, and is known by many Jews and non-Jews alike.  The lyrics of the song are simple and about making a dreidel and playing with it. The lyrics are as follows:

I have a little dreidel
I made it out of clay,
And when it's dry and ready
O dreidel I shall play.
O dreidel dreidel dreidel
I made it out of clay,
And when it's dry and ready,
O dreidel I shall play.

Sevivon 

A popular Hebrew Hanukkah song, "Sevivon" or "S'vivon" (Hebrew: סביבון sevivon) is Hebrew for "dreidel", where dreidel (Hebrew: דרײדל  dreydl) is the Yiddish word for a spinning top.  This song, "Sevivon," is very popular in Israel and by others familiar with the Hebrew language.  The English below is a literal translation, not an English version.

Al Hanisim 

"Al Hanisim" (or "Al Hanissim") is a popular Hebrew song for Hanukkah taken from liturgy (see Hanukkah → Special additions to the daily prayers), and is also an Israeli folk dance.  The song is about thanking God for saving the Jewish people. The most popular tune, however, is relatively recent, having been composed by Dov Frimer in 1975.

Mi Y'malel 
"Mi Y'malel" (or "Mi Yimalel") (Hebrew: מי ימלל "Who can retell?") is a very well known Hebrew Hanukkah song. The opening line, which literally means "Who can retell the mighty feats of Israel," is a secular rewording of Psalms 106:2, which reads "Who can retell the mighty feats of God." Below is  a singable version of this song called "Who Can Retell," with words based on the Hebrew, as well as a literal translation. The song can also be sung in a round or canon.

 Mi Y'malel with instruments and 2 voices, by Rosenthal and Safyan.

Ner Li 
Literally translated as "I have a candle," "Ner Li" is a simple Hebrew Hanukkah song that is popular in Israel. The words are by L. Kipnis and the music, by D. Samburski.

The transliteration of the Hebrew is as follows:

The literal translation is:
I have a candle, I have a small thin candle
On Hanukkah, my candle I will light.
On Hanukkah my candle will glow
On Hanukkah I will sing songs.

Chanukah Chanukah 
Another traditional Chanukah folk song with origins in Israel is Chanukah, Chanukah 
Words by Levin Kipnis
Transliterated and translated by Gila Ansell Brauner of Jerusalem, Israel

CHANUKAH, CHANUKAH

Chanukah, Chanukah,
What a lovely holiday!
Cheerful lights around us shine,
Children have fun and play.

Chanukah, Chanukah,
The dreidel spins and spins.
Spin your top until it stops,
Have a good time, see who wins!

חנוכה חנוכה
עממי 
מילים: לוין קיפניס
לחן: עממי

חנוכה, חנוכה, 
חג יפה כל כך 
אור חביב מסביב, 
גיל לילד רך. 
חנוכה, חנוכה, 
סביבון סוב סוב 
סוב נא סוב, סוב נא סוב 
מה נעים מה טוב.

Ocho Kandelikas
Ocho Kandelikas  'Eight Little Candles') is a Ladino song celebrating the holiday of Hanukkah, written by the Jewish-American composer Flory Jagoda in 1983.

Drey dreydl 
Drei dreidl is a Hanukkah song written by Moyshe Oysher. The melody is the same as that of Itsik Manger's "Yosl Ber", composed by D. Beygelman [see "Pearls of Yiddish Song", by Chana & Joseph Mlotek, p.173]. According to the Mloteks, the melody has also been used for the Holocaust song, "Ikh leb in geto in kavkaz" [I live in the ghetto in the Caucasus], by Khane Kheytin, and for the song "Vi der zeyger tut a klung" [When the clock strikes], by Sam Liptzin.

Non-traditional songs

(I'm Spending) Hanukkah in Santa Monica
"(I'm Spending) Hanukkah in Santa Monica" is a song written by satirist singer-songwriter and mathematician Tom Lehrer.

Light One Candle
"Light One Candle" is a 1983 Hanukkah song written by Peter Yarrow of Peter, Paul, and Mary.  It is a very popular song and it has been sung by the trio at their concerts.  It is a song that encourages the Jewish people to remember the history of the holiday and continue their heritage.  Light One Candle lyrics

The Chanukah Song
The Chanukah Song is a series of popular Hanukkah songs by Adam Sandler that are each a slightly different variation of a list of Jewish celebrities listed by Sandler for Jewish children who feel isolated during the Christmas season. It began as a skit on Saturday Night Live and then appeared on his album What the Hell Happened to Me?. Due to its popularity, Sandler recorded three follow-ups of the song. The songs often gets airplay during the winter holiday season.

Eight Days of Hanukka
"Eight Days of Hanukka" is a Hanukkah song written by Senator Orrin Hatch and Madeline Stone, a Jewish songwriter from the Upper West Side of Manhattan who specializes in Christian music.  The song was written at the suggestion of Jeffrey Goldberg.

Hanukkah Hey Ya

"Hanukkah Hey Ya" is a Hanukkah spoof of a chart-topping 2003 OutKast song, "Hey Ya!," by American comedian Eric Schwartz. The song was made into an e-card in 2004.  In 2009 Nefesh B'Nefesh produced a Hanukkah Flash Mob viral video that became a major success.  The mob assembled on Jerusalem's Ben Yehuda Street and was choreographed by new immigrant Marvin Casey.

Candlelight

"Candlelight" is a song written and sung by The Maccabeats, an undergraduate a cappella group at Yeshiva University. The song is a cover parody of "Dynamite" by Taio Cruz, with lyrics retelling the Hanukkah story. It was released in late 2010 and quickly achieved viral status. Since 2010, The Maccabeats have produced an annual Hanukkah music video.

References

External links
 Chanukah Song Sheet (pdf)
 Chanukah Song Sheets
 Chanukah Song Sheets PDF creator
 Hanukkah Songs in Hebrew and English with transliterations.
 Hanukkah songsheets
 Hanukkah songs

 
Jewish music
Hebrew-language songs